Bassam Abdel Majeed (born 1950) is a Syrian military officer, politician and diplomat of Circassian origin.

Early life and education
Majeed is of Circassian origin, and was born into a Sunni Muslim family in 1950 in Beer Ajam, a village in the Quneitra Governorate in southwestern Syria. He attended Syria's Air Force Academy, graduating in 1970.

Career
Majeed held several military and security posts. He was director of the military police from 2003 to 2006. He was appointed the interior minister of Syria on 11 February 2006, succeeding Ghazi Kanaan. When he was in office, Hezbollah commander Imad Mugniyeh was killed in Damascus in February 2008. Majeed described the attack as "terrorist act".

Majeed's term lasted until 23 April 2009 and he was replaced by Said Mohammad Sammour. In October 2009, Majeed was appointed Syria's ambassador to Kuwait.

Personal life
Majeed is married, and has two daughters and one son.

References

1950 births
Living people
People from Quneitra District
Syrian people of Circassian descent
Syrian Sunni Muslims
Arab Socialist Ba'ath Party – Syria Region politicians
Syrian ministers of interior
Ambassadors of Syria to Kuwait